Yedigen Football Team is a Turkmen professional football club based in Ashgabat. It is the football team of the International Turkmen-Turkish University. Their home stadium is the HTTU Stadium which can hold 1,000 people and is located on the university's grounds.

History
The club was formed by the International Turkmen-Turkish University in 2003 under the name HTTU Aşgabat.

In 2012, the team placed 3rd in the Ýokary Liga.

In 2013, HTTU won the Ýokary Liga, Turkmenistan Super Cup, and Eskişehir Cup. Süleýman Muhadow scored 23 goals during the season, placing second in the golden boot race.

The following year, in the wake of several important departures, including the club's captain, Rovshen Meredov was appointed manager. Under Meredov, HTTU reached the final of the Turkmenistan Super Cup, losing 4–2 to FC Ahal. As a result of its success in the 2013 season, HTTU earned a spot in the 2014 AFC President's Cup in the Philippines, eventually defeating North Korean side Rimyongsu 2–1 in the final. Suleyman Muhadov was named both tournament MVP and top scorer with 11 goals.

From 2016, the club changed its name to Ýedigen FC and was relegated from the Ýokary Liga.

Domestic

Continental

CIS cup

Honours
 Turkmenistan League (4)
 Winners: 2005, 2006, 2009, 2013
 Runners-up: 2007, 2008, 2011
 Turkmenistan Cup (2)
 Winners: 2006, 2011
 Runners-up: 2008, 2012
 Turkmenistan Super Cup (3)
 Winners: 2005, 2009, 2012
 Runners-up: 2006, 2011
 Turkmenistan President's Cup (3)
 Winner: 2007, 2008, 2009
 Runners-up: 2006

Managers
 Oraz Geldiýew (2003–06)
 Ýazguly Hojageldyýew (2006–13)
 Röwşen Meredow (2014)
 Begench Garayev (2014–present)

References

Links 
 Yedigen Ashgabat at FIFA site

Football clubs in Turkmenistan
Football clubs in Ashgabat
2003 establishments in Turkmenistan
Association football clubs established in 2003
AFC President's Cup winning clubs